Mefexamide (INN, USAN) (brand names Perneuron, Peroxinorm, Timodyne; developmental code name ANP-297), also known as mefexadyne and mexephenamide, is a central nervous system stimulant that is no longer marketed.

See also
 Clofexamide
 Dimethocaine
 Meclofenoxate

References

Abandoned drugs
Phenol ethers
Stimulants
Diethylamino compounds